Udland Church is a parish church of the Church of Norway in Haugesund Municipality in Rogaland county, Norway. It is located in the town of Haugesund. It is one of the two churches for the Skåre parish which is part of the Haugaland prosti (deanery) in the Diocese of Stavanger. The white, brick church was built in a rectangular style in 2002 using designs by the architect Thomas Brekke. The church seats about 450 people.

Media gallery

See also
List of churches in Rogaland

References

Haugesund
Churches in Rogaland
Brick churches in Norway
21st-century Church of Norway church buildings
Churches completed in 2002
2002 establishments in Norway